is a town located in Minami-Matsuura District, Nagasaki Prefecture, Japan.

The town was established on August 1, 2004 after the merger of the towns of Arikawa, Kamigotō, Narao, Shin-Uonome and Wakamatsu, all from Minami-Matsuura District. It occupies the two main islands of Nakadōri and Wakamatsu, which are connected by Wakamatsu Oohashi ("Wakamatsu Great Bridge") via the small, unpopulated islet of Kaminakajima (上中島), as well as several smaller islands, including the populated islands of Arifuku, Hinoshima, Ryōzegaura, Kashiragashima, and Kirinoko. Wakamatsu Island is connected at its northwestern extremity to Ryōzegaura Island by the Ryōzegaura Bridge, and Ryōzegaura Island is further linked with the islands of Arifuku and Hinoshima by breakwaters that allow traffic of automobiles. Kashiragashima Oohashi connects the eastern end of the main island of Nakadōri with Kashiragashima, on which the famous Kashiragashima Church and the defunct Kamigotō Airport are located.

The islands that comprise the territory of Shin-Kamigotō Town also form the northeastern half of the Gotō Islands archipelago, which is the origin of the name Kamigotō (literally, "Upper Five Islands"), in which Gotō ("Five Islands") is the name of the entire archipelago, and Kami- ("Upper") refers to the fact that this half of the archipelago is located closer to the Japanese capital relative to the southwestern half. The prefix Shin- (新) at the beginning of the town's name means "new," so its full name may be translated literally to English as "New Upper Five Islands Town," though the name may be interpreted to refer to the town as a new and expanded version of the former Kamigotō Town, which was centered on the port of Aokata on the western side of the middle of Nakadōri Island.

As of March 31, 2017, the town has an estimated population of 19,866 and a density of 93 persons per km2. The total area is 213.98 km2.

Geography

Climate
Shin-Kamigotō has the typical humid subtropical climate (Köppen Cfa) of Kyūshū, characterized by mild winters and long, hot, and humid summers.

Population

Changes in Population

References

External links

 Shinkamigotō official website 
 English Tourist Information Website 

Towns in Nagasaki Prefecture
Populated places established in 2004
2004 establishments in Japan